Sebae may refer to:

Animals
Sebae anemone, a species of sea anemone

As part of a species name
Sebae is a specific name for several species:
Amphiprion sebae, the sebae clownfish
Aranea sebae, a synonym for the northern/giant golden orb weaver
Argonauta sebae, an alternate name for the greater argonaut
Lutjanus sebae, the emperor red snapper
Mammilla sebae, a predatory sea snail
Monodactylus sebae, the African moonyfish
Ninia sebae, the redback coffee snake
Python sebae, the African rock python

Other uses
Sebae, a Korean New Year ritual
Shareef Al-Sebae, a player on the Syria national under-17 football team